is a retired Japanese professional baseball player. During his 24 seasons in Nippon Professional Baseball, he played for the Chunichi Dragons, the Orix BlueWave, and the Tohoku Rakuten Golden Eagles.

Career
He helped lead the Dragons to the 1999 Japan Series (which they ultimately lost to the Fukuoka Daiei Hawks, 4-games-to-1).

On April 1, 2007, José Fernández and Yamasaki hit grand slams in the same inning for the Tohoku Rakuten Golden Eagles. Yamasaki led the Pacific League in home runs and RBI in 2007, also being selected for a Best Nine Award as a designated hitter.

Yamasaki was the MVP of the 2008 All Star Game #1. He had 2 home runs in the 2009 Climax Series.

Yamasaki was awarded the 2011 Golden Spirit Award, given to a NPB player who "best exemplifies the game of baseball, sportsmanship, community involvement and the individual's contribution to his team", as voted on by members of the media.

Yamasaki played 24 years in NPB, retiring after the 2013 season with 403 home runs, placing him 17th all-time in Japanese professional baseball.

List 
 List of top Nippon Professional Baseball home run hitters

References

1968 births
Living people
People from Chita, Aichi
Chunichi Dragons players
Gulf Coast Dodgers players
Japanese expatriate baseball players in the United States
Nippon Professional Baseball designated hitters
Nippon Professional Baseball infielders
Orix BlueWave players
Baseball people from Aichi Prefecture
Tohoku Rakuten Golden Eagles players